A slacker is a person who procrastinates or is lazy.

Slacker may also mean:

Arts, entertainment, and media
Slacker (film), 1991 American independent comedy-drama movie
Slackers (film), 2002 American romantic comedy movie
Slacker Radio (launched 2007), online radio
Slacker Uprising, a Michael Moore re-cut version of his 2008 film Captain Mike Across America (2008)
 The Slackers (album)
The Slackers (active since 1991), ska musical group from New York

Other uses
Slacker (producer) (died 2012), electronic music producer
Slacker, a person who uses or advocates use of the Slackware distribution of the Linux operating system
Slackers CDs and Games (founded 1993), an entertainment retailer

See also
Slacklining